Pabbay is the name of several islands in the Outer Hebrides of Scotland:

 Pabbay, Barra Isles, to the south of Barra
 Pabbay, Harris, in the Sound of Harris, between Harris and North Uist
 Pabbay, Loch Baghasdail, in Loch Baghasdail, off South Uist

See also
 Papey
 Pabay 
 Papa, Scotland